The 2002 J&S Cup was a tennis tournament played on clay courts in Warsaw, Poland the event was part of the 2002 WTA Tour. The tournament was held from May 6 to 12, 2002. Tathiana Garbin and Janette Husárová were the reigning champions, but chose not to defend their title. Jelena Kostanić and Henrieta Nagyová won in the final against Evgenia Kulikovskaya and Silvija Talaja, 6–1, 6–1.

Seeds

  Émilie Loit /  Roberta Vinci (quarterfinals)
  Laura Montalvo /  María Emilia Salerni (quarterfinals)
  Samantha Reeves /  Irina Selyutina (quarterfinals)
  Eva Bes /  María Vento-Kabchi (first round)

Main draw

Draw

References

JandS Cup - Doubles